Drill Dozer is a platform game for the Game Boy Advance developed by Game Freak and published by Nintendo. The game was released in 2005 in Japan, and in 2006 in North America, with a later European localisation being released on the Wii U eShop in 2016 with rumble support. It is one of only two Game Boy Advance games to include force feedback, the other being WarioWare: Twisted!. It received positive reviews on release, and is now often considered one of the best Game Boy Advance games of all time.

Gameplay
Drill Dozer is an action platformer in which the player controls Jill and her Drill Dozer. All seventeen massive stages are flooded with enemies, obstacles, and puzzles which force Jill to use Drill Dozer's drill in a wide variety of ways. The drill is activated by simply pushing one of the shoulder buttons. The R button spins the drill forward and the L button spins it backwards.

Scattered throughout the stage are red boxes marked with yellow wrenches that contain either chips or health. Each stage also contains two red gears that upgrades the drill's gearbox to allow Jill to shift her Drill Dozer to the second and third gears. The higher the gear, the more powerful the Drill Dozer's drill is and the longer it spins.

At the end of each stage (with the exception of the secret stages), Jill must face off against an enormous boss and use her drill to exploit and damage its weak point.

In each world, there is a mini-boss and a boss. All of the bosses can be defeated by using the drill in various ways. The only boss where the drill isn't used is in the final battle with Croog. The Drill Dozer falls apart, and Jill's only method of attack (and defense at that) is her fists. This final battle is the only battle where the boss does not have a health meter, as only one successful hit is required to defeat him.

When Jill's Drill Dozer runs out of health, the player receives a game over. The player can then resume the game at the beginning of the room the Drill Dozer was destroyed in by paying the shopkeeper fifty chips.

The Red Dozers' Trailer serves as Drill Dozers "main menu". Here the player can save their progress, examine Jill's Drill Dozer's equipment, check the treasure they have accumulated, or visit shopkeeper's shop purchase energy tanks, drill bit upgrades, and maps to access chips. The shop is available after the first area, Skullker Factory, is beaten.

Plot
She is the daughter of Doug, the leader of a bandit gang known as The Red Dozers. Doug was ambushed by a rival gang known as the Skullkers. They attacked the Red Dozers to steal the powerful Red Diamond, a gift from Jill's dead mother. To retrieve it, Jill mounts the powerful vehicle, the Drill Dozer.

On the way, she also comes across four other diamonds: the Yellow Diamond, which was kept in the Art Museum and drove Carrie insane; the Blue Diamond, which was floating about Kuru Ruins and stirring things up (it brought a stone statue to life and even took control of a swarm of fish); the Green Diamond, which the unnamed police warden used to animate his massive robot, with which he battles Jill; and the Dark Diamond, which gave Croog his alien appearance and unimaginable power. At the end, the Dark Diamond shatters and Croog's alien face falls off, revealing it to be a mask. Croog's true face is unknown, as a head of long blond hair drops over his eyes and he runs off-screen, sobbing and concealing his appearance with his hands. At the game's conclusion, two of the Diamonds- the Blue and Green Diamonds- are stolen by the Magnet Sisters (both serve as a recurring boss), the Yellow Diamond is returned to the Art Museum and Jill keeps the Red Diamond. Afterwards, Jill is appointed the new boss by her father, and they drive away.

Development
Drill Dozer was originally revealed at E3 2005, originally titled Screw Breaker, a translation of its Japanese title. It would later be released in Japan on September 22, 2005, and in North America on February 6, 2006.

The game was localized by Nintendo of America's Treehouse division, specifically by employee Thomas Connery, who translated all of the Japanese text into English, and fellow Treehouse employee Eric Peterson's job was to rewrite and polish it afterward. Peterson stated that much of his time was spent rewriting jokes or lines to make them funny or understandable for English audiences. He was also responsible for naming every character, stage, and room in the game. Eric stated that the developers infused protagonist Jill with a lot of personality and attitude, saying that her actions rather than her dialogue, which is limited, define her character. He describes her as cute as well as tough, having to grow up fast due to her father's injuries in order to fill in for him while he recovers, as well as recovering the Red Diamond that a rival gang stole that was given to her by her now-deceased mother. He also called her a great example of a character who is unapologetic about how tough and cute she is. An interviewer described Jill's appearance as eccentric, and asked Peterson if anything had been done to transition from Japan to America. Peterson stated that while things often do change during localization, Jill was already interesting enough that she didn't need to be changed; he also added that the Drill Dozer itself was as much of a character as Jill was, citing the scene where the drill had to go on its own to find her.

Reception

Drill Dozer received "favorable" reviews according to video game review aggregator Metacritic. In Japan, Famitsu gave it a score of one eight, one nine, and two eights, for a total of 33 out of 40.

The game was nominated as GBA Game of the Year by Nintendo Power, as well as Overall Game of the Year, and Best New Character (Jill) and Best Platformer throughout all systems for 2006. Of these, it won GBA Game of the Year as "NP's Pick". It was also runner-up for GameSpot's Game Boy Advance Game of the Year.

Legacy
The game originally released in Japan and North America only, meaning it only released with a Japanese and English script at first. However a full pentalingual translation for an eventual European release was finalised in 2006, yet the game was never announced for a European release. It remained unreleased until January 2016, when the game was added to the European Wii U eShop as part of the Virtual Console.

Jill appeared as an Assist Trophy in Super Smash Bros. Brawl and as a spirit in Super Smash Bros. Ultimate.

The game is often considered one of the best games on the Game Boy Advance. GamesRadar+ named it the 16th best game on the platform, writing that "protagonist Jill and her highly customizable drill explored many impressively expansive stages, and the storytelling reminded us of our favorite manic anime series. The game was made more even more impactful thanks to the rumble pack attached to the cart, a feature exploited in few games, and one that Drill Dozer uses with panache". USGamer called it "one of the last great GBA games", and praised its gameplay, graphics, and story. NintendoLife also listed it among their top 25 best Game Boy Advance games of all time. Senior contributor to Forbes, Matt Gardner, also named it as one of the best platform exclusives, calling it "arguably the best platformer on the entire console".

Notes

References

External links
Official Nintendo website 

2005 video games
Action video games
Game Boy Advance games
Game Freak games
Nintendo games
Platform games
Video games scored by Go Ichinose
Video games developed in Japan
Video games featuring female protagonists
Virtual Console games
Virtual Console games for Wii U